= Mișcarea femenistă =

1930s newspaper in Chişinău, Bessarabia

Mişcarea femenistă
- Type: Bimonthly
- Founder(s): Elena Djionat, Nina Siţinsky, Daria Bodescu
- Founded: June 18, 1933
- Ceased publication: 1934
- Language: Romanian
- Headquarters: 3 Miron Costin, Chişinău

Mişcarea femenistă (English: The Feminist Movement) was a newspaper from Chişinău, Bessarabia, founded in 1933.

== Bibliography ==
- Eugen Ştefan Holban, Dicţionar cronologic: Prin veacurile învolburate ale Moldovei dintre Prut şi Nistru, Chişinău, 1998.
